INS Shishumar (S44) is the lead vessel of the  of diesel-electric submarines of the Indian Navy. She was commissioned on 22 September 1986 under Commander P M Bhate.

Mid Life Upgrade

Indian Navy awarded $151mn contract for mid-life upgrade and certification of INS Shishumar, the refit will be carried out by Mazagon Dock, Mumbai with technical cooperation from ThyssenKrupp Marine Systems.

References

Shishumar-class submarines
Attack submarines
Ships built in Kiel
1984 ships
Submarines of India